The Hunchback of Notre Dame: An Original Walt Disney Records Soundtrack is the soundtrack to the 1996 Disney animated feature film, The Hunchback of Notre Dame. It includes songs written by Alan Menken and Stephen Schwartz with vocals performed by Paul Kandel, David Ogden Stiers, Tony Jay, Tom Hulce, Heidi Mollenhauer, Jason Alexander, Mary Wickes, and Mary Stout, along with singles by All-4-One/Eternal, and the film's score composed by Alan Menken.

The single "Someday" originally performed by male R&B band All-4-One on the United States release, was redone by British R&B girl group Eternal for the U.K. release. Luis Miguel recorded the version in Spanish as "Sueña", which became a major hit in Latin America. The album was released on May 28, 1996, by Walt Disney Records, and went on to peak at No. 11 on the Billboard 200.

In 2021, a restored version of the soundtrack was reissued as part of Disney's The Legacy Collection. In addition to the complete songs and score, the two disc set includes demos, outtakes and German language theatrical versions of the songs.

Track listing

Sales and certifications

References

Disney animation soundtracks
1996 soundtrack albums
1990s film soundtrack albums
Walt Disney Records soundtracks
Disney Renaissance soundtracks
The Hunchback of Notre Dame (franchise)
Albums produced by Alan Menken
Albums produced by Stephen Schwartz (composer)
Alan Menken soundtracks